Navarretia subuligera is a species of flowering plant in the phlox family known by the common names awl-leaf pincushionplant or awl-leaved navarretia. It is native to southern Oregon and northern California, where it grows in open, wet habitat, such as meadows and vernal pools. It is a hairy, purple-colored annual herb growing up to about 16 centimeters tall. The leaves are divided into many linear lobes. The inflorescence is a cluster of many flowers surrounded by leaflike bracts with awl-shaped lobes. The flowers are white and under a centimeter in length.

References

External links
Jepson Manual Treatment
Photo gallery

subuligera
Flora of California
Flora of Oregon
Flora without expected TNC conservation status